The 1954 VFL season was the 58th season of the Victorian Football League (VFL), the highest level senior Australian rules football competition in Victoria. The season featured twelve clubs, ran from 17 April until 25 September, and comprised an 18-game home-and-away season followed by a finals series featuring the top four clubs.

The premiership was won by the Footscray Football Club for the first time, after it defeated  by 51 points in the 1954 VFL Grand Final.

Premiership season
In 1954, the VFL competition consisted of twelve teams of 18 on-the-field players each, plus two substitute players, known as the 19th man and the 20th man. A player could be substituted for any reason; however, once substituted, a player could not return to the field of play under any circumstances.

Teams played each other in a home-and-away season of 18 rounds; matches 12 to 18 were the "home-and-way reverse" of matches 1 to 7.

Once the 18 round home-and-away season had finished, the 1954 VFL Premiers were determined by the specific format and conventions of the Page–McIntyre system.

Round 1

|- bgcolor="#CCCCFF"
| Home team
| Home team score
| Away team
| Away team score
| Venue
| Crowd
| Date
|- bgcolor="#FFFFFF"
| 
| 7.11 (53)
| 
| 9.10 (64)
| Western Oval
| 24,000
| 17 April 1954
|- bgcolor="#FFFFFF"
| 
| 7.16 (58)
| 
| 19.16 (130)
| Brunswick Street Oval
| 27,000
| 17 April 1954
|- bgcolor="#FFFFFF"
| 
| 11.18 (84)
| 
| 11.13 (79)
| Lake Oval
| 38,000
| 17 April 1954
|- bgcolor="#FFFFFF"
| 
| 15.11 (101)
| 
| 13.14 (92)
| Arden Street Oval
| 24,000
| 19 April 1954
|- bgcolor="#FFFFFF"
| 
| 8.13 (61)
| 
| 14.11 (95)
| Glenferrie Oval
| 23,000
| 19 April 1954
|- bgcolor="#FFFFFF"
| 
| 9.10 (64)
| 
| 15.12 (102)
| MCG
| 45,848
| 19 April 1954

Round 2

|- bgcolor="#CCCCFF"
| Home team
| Home team score
| Away team
| Away team score
| Venue
| Crowd
| Date
|- bgcolor="#FFFFFF"
| 
| 8.12 (60)
| 
| 9.15 (69)
| Kardinia Park
| 21,000
| 24 April 1954
|- bgcolor="#FFFFFF"
| 
| 5.18 (48)
| 
| 8.13 (61)
| Windy Hill
| 23,000
| 24 April 1954
|- bgcolor="#FFFFFF"
| 
| 12.12 (84)
| 
| 5.8 (38)
| Victoria Park
| 25,000
| 24 April 1954
|- bgcolor="#FFFFFF"
| 
| 12.10 (82)
| 
| 15.11 (101)
| Princes Park
| 21,000
| 24 April 1954
|- bgcolor="#FFFFFF"
| 
| 5.9 (39)
| 
| 10.10 (70)
| Junction Oval
| 14,000
| 24 April 1954
|- bgcolor="#FFFFFF"
| 
| 12.19 (91)
| 
| 9.19 (73)
| Punt Road Oval
| 23,000
| 24 April 1954

Round 3

|- bgcolor="#CCCCFF"
| Home team
| Home team score
| Away team
| Away team score
| Venue
| Crowd
| Date
|- bgcolor="#FFFFFF"
| 
| 11.9 (75)
| 
| 9.10 (64)
| Glenferrie Oval
| 17,000
| 1 May 1954
|- bgcolor="#FFFFFF"
| 
| 17.14 (116)
| 
| 3.11 (29)
| Western Oval
| 24,500
| 1 May 1954
|- bgcolor="#FFFFFF"
| 
| 9.10 (64)
| 
| 13.16 (94)
| Brunswick Street Oval
| 16,000
| 1 May 1954
|- bgcolor="#FFFFFF"
| 
| 15.10 (100)
| 
| 16.20 (116)
| Windy Hill
| 27,500
| 1 May 1954
|- bgcolor="#FFFFFF"
| 
| 10.10 (70)
| 
| 10.16 (76)
| Junction Oval
| 22,500
| 1 May 1954
|- bgcolor="#FFFFFF"
| 
| 14.20 (104)
| 
| 12.8 (80)
| Punt Road Oval
| 25,000
| 1 May 1954

Round 4

|- bgcolor="#CCCCFF"
| Home team
| Home team score
| Away team
| Away team score
| Venue
| Crowd
| Date
|- bgcolor="#FFFFFF"
| 
| 13.17 (95)
| 
| 8.5 (53)
| Kardinia Park
| 18,000
| 8 May 1954
|- bgcolor="#FFFFFF"
| 
| 10.17 (77)
| 
| 9.10 (64)
| Victoria Park
| 37,000
| 8 May 1954
|- bgcolor="#FFFFFF"
| 
| 17.21 (123)
| 
| 20.14 (134)
| Princes Park
| 22,000
| 8 May 1954
|- bgcolor="#FFFFFF"
| 
| 12.9 (81)
| 
| 10.16 (76)
| Lake Oval
| 23,000
| 8 May 1954
|- bgcolor="#FFFFFF"
| 
| 11.10 (76)
| 
| 10.13 (73)
| Arden Street Oval
| 16,000
| 8 May 1954
|- bgcolor="#FFFFFF"
| 
| 14.12 (96)
| 
| 7.12 (54)
| MCG
| 17,500
| 8 May 1954

Round 5

|- bgcolor="#CCCCFF"
| Home team
| Home team score
| Away team
| Away team score
| Venue
| Crowd
| Date
|- bgcolor="#FFFFFF"
| 
| 14.13 (97)
| 
| 10.7 (67)
| MCG
| 24,247
| 15 May 1954
|- bgcolor="#FFFFFF"
| 
| 11.7 (73)
| 
| 5.5 (35)
| Western Oval
| 25,500
| 15 May 1954
|- bgcolor="#FFFFFF"
| 
| 10.16 (76)
| 
| 11.10 (76)
| Brunswick Street Oval
| 12,000
| 15 May 1954
|- bgcolor="#FFFFFF"
| 
| 14.13 (97)
| 
| 13.14 (92)
| Glenferrie Oval
| 18,000
| 15 May 1954
|- bgcolor="#FFFFFF"
| 
| 6.13 (49)
| 
| 14.17 (101)
| Lake Oval
| 30,000
| 15 May 1954
|- bgcolor="#FFFFFF"
| 
| 8.18 (66)
| 
| 9.15 (69)
| Windy Hill
| 25,000
| 15 May 1954

Round 6

|- bgcolor="#CCCCFF"
| Home team
| Home team score
| Away team
| Away team score
| Venue
| Crowd
| Date
|- bgcolor="#FFFFFF"
| 
| 8.14 (62)
| 
| 12.13 (85)
| Arden Street Oval
| 15,000
| 22 May 1954
|- bgcolor="#FFFFFF"
| 
| 14.15 (99)
| 
| 12.6 (78)
| Junction Oval
| 16,000
| 22 May 1954
|- bgcolor="#FFFFFF"
| 
| 10.12 (72)
| 
| 11.12 (78)
| Punt Road Oval
| 23,000
| 22 May 1954
|- bgcolor="#FFFFFF"
| 
| 12.8 (80)
| 
| 4.7 (31)
| Western Oval
| 30,000
| 22 May 1954
|- bgcolor="#FFFFFF"
| 
| 13.17 (95)
| 
| 9.8 (62)
| Kardinia Park
| 32,500
| 22 May 1954
|- bgcolor="#FFFFFF"
| 
| 8.10 (58)
| 
| 15.10 (100)
| Brunswick Street Oval
| 20,000
| 22 May 1954

Round 7

|- bgcolor="#CCCCFF"
| Home team
| Home team score
| Away team
| Away team score
| Venue
| Crowd
| Date
|- bgcolor="#FFFFFF"
| 
| 15.21 (111)
| 
| 14.5 (89)
| MCG
| 23,025
| 29 May 1954
|- bgcolor="#FFFFFF"
| 
| 22.13 (145)
| 
| 7.12 (54)
| Windy Hill
| 17,500
| 29 May 1954
|- bgcolor="#FFFFFF"
| 
| 11.8 (74)
| 
| 14.13 (97)
| Victoria Park
| 34,000
| 29 May 1954
|- bgcolor="#FFFFFF"
| 
| 12.20 (92)
| 
| 11.16 (82)
| Princes Park
| 31,000
| 29 May 1954
|- bgcolor="#FFFFFF"
| 
| 10.12 (72)
| 
| 9.24 (78)
| Junction Oval
| 20,500
| 29 May 1954
|- bgcolor="#FFFFFF"
| 
| 10.9 (69)
| 
| 11.12 (78)
| Glenferrie Oval
| 26,000
| 29 May 1954

Round 8

|- bgcolor="#CCCCFF"
| Home team
| Home team score
| Away team
| Away team score
| Venue
| Crowd
| Date
|- bgcolor="#FFFFFF"
| 
| 17.13 (115)
| 
| 10.6 (66)
| Punt Road Oval
| 17,000
| 5 June 1954
|- bgcolor="#FFFFFF"
| 
| 11.5 (71)
| 
| 10.20 (80)
| Kardinia Park
| 17,000
| 5 June 1954
|- bgcolor="#FFFFFF"
| 
| 14.14 (98)
| 
| 10.15 (75)
| Windy Hill
| 23,000
| 5 June 1954
|- bgcolor="#FFFFFF"
| 
| 6.13 (49)
| 
| 8.10 (58)
| Lake Oval
| 22,000
| 5 June 1954
|- bgcolor="#FFFFFF"
| 
| 13.9 (87)
| 
| 10.14 (74)
| Western Oval
| 21,000
| 5 June 1954
|- bgcolor="#FFFFFF"
| 
| 11.15 (81)
| 
| 10.12 (72)
| Victoria Park
| 40,000
| 5 June 1954

Round 9

|- bgcolor="#CCCCFF"
| Home team
| Home team score
| Away team
| Away team score
| Venue
| Crowd
| Date
|- bgcolor="#FFFFFF"
| 
| 2.18 (30)
| 
| 13.18 (96)
| Junction Oval
| 21,500
| 12 June 1954
|- bgcolor="#FFFFFF"
| 
| 6.17 (53)
| 
| 11.13 (79)
| Brunswick Street Oval
| 19,000
| 12 June 1954
|- bgcolor="#FFFFFF"
| 
| 13.13 (91)
| 
| 10.12 (72)
| Arden Street Oval
| 30,000
| 12 June 1954
|- bgcolor="#FFFFFF"
| 
| 5.11 (41)
| 
| 4.12 (36)
| Princes Park
| 34,000
| 14 June 1954
|- bgcolor="#FFFFFF"
| 
| 9.13 (67)
| 
| 8.15 (63)
| Kardinia Park
| 33,400
| 14 June 1954
|- bgcolor="#FFFFFF"
| 
| 11.13 (79)
| 
| 14.17 (101)
| MCG
| 36,800
| 14 June 1954

Round 10

|- bgcolor="#CCCCFF"
| Home team
| Home team score
| Away team
| Away team score
| Venue
| Crowd
| Date
|- bgcolor="#FFFFFF"
| 
| 10.13 (73)
| 
| 8.9 (57)
| Western Oval
| 24,000
| 26 June 1954
|- bgcolor="#FFFFFF"
| 
| 11.10 (76)
| 
| 10.14 (74)
| Brunswick Street Oval
| 14,000
| 26 June 1954
|- bgcolor="#FFFFFF"
| 
| 18.12 (120)
| 
| 13.17 (95)
| Punt Road Oval
| 30,000
| 26 June 1954
|- bgcolor="#FFFFFF"
| 
| 9.12 (66)
| 
| 10.19 (79)
| Junction Oval
| 20,000
| 26 June 1954
|- bgcolor="#FFFFFF"
| 
| 11.5 (71)
| 
| 10.15 (75)
| Glenferrie Oval
| 25,000
| 26 June 1954
|- bgcolor="#FFFFFF"
| 
| 9.13 (67)
| 
| 9.10 (64)
| Arden Street Oval
| 25,000
| 26 June 1954

Round 11

|- bgcolor="#CCCCFF"
| Home team
| Home team score
| Away team
| Away team score
| Venue
| Crowd
| Date
|- bgcolor="#FFFFFF"
| 
| 15.15 (105)
| 
| 11.6 (72)
| MCG
| 18,180
| 3 July 1954
|- bgcolor="#FFFFFF"
| 
| 13.9 (87)
| 
| 13.6 (84)
| Windy Hill
| 28,000
| 3 July 1954
|- bgcolor="#FFFFFF"
| 
| 12.10 (82)
| 
| 10.12 (72)
| Victoria Park
| 40,000
| 3 July 1954
|- bgcolor="#FFFFFF"
| 
| 9.16 (70)
| 
| 12.10 (82)
| Princes Park
| 15,000
| 3 July 1954
|- bgcolor="#FFFFFF"
| 
| 9.10 (64)
| 
| 17.12 (114)
| Lake Oval
| 18,000
| 3 July 1954
|- bgcolor="#FFFFFF"
| 
| 11.15 (81)
| 
| 11.10 (76)
| Glenferrie Oval
| 12,000
| 3 July 1954

Round 12

|- bgcolor="#CCCCFF"
| Home team
| Home team score
| Away team
| Away team score
| Venue
| Crowd
| Date
|- bgcolor="#FFFFFF"
| 
| 13.16 (94)
| 
| 9.9 (63)
| Windy Hill
| 20,000
| 10 July 1954
|- bgcolor="#FFFFFF"
| 
| 8.6 (54)
| 
| 5.16 (46)
| Victoria Park
| 29,000
| 10 July 1954
|- bgcolor="#FFFFFF"
| 
| 11.10 (76)
| 
| 10.10 (70)
| Princes Park
| 17,000
| 10 July 1954
|- bgcolor="#FFFFFF"
| 
| 14.14 (98)
| 
| 6.15 (51)
| Punt Road Oval
| 27,000
| 10 July 1954
|- bgcolor="#FFFFFF"
| 
| 9.8 (62)
| 
| 13.14 (92)
| Junction Oval
| 22,500
| 10 July 1954
|- bgcolor="#FFFFFF"
| 
| 10.8 (68)
| 
| 6.6 (42)
| Kardinia Park
| 15,000
| 10 July 1954

Round 13

|- bgcolor="#CCCCFF"
| Home team
| Home team score
| Away team
| Away team score
| Venue
| Crowd
| Date
|- bgcolor="#FFFFFF"
| 
| 14.17 (101)
| 
| 5.10 (40)
| Glenferrie Oval
| 11,000
| 17 July 1954
|- bgcolor="#FFFFFF"
| 
| 5.13 (43)
| 
| 10.2 (62)
| Arden Street Oval
| 20,000
| 17 July 1954
|- bgcolor="#FFFFFF"
| 
| 10.16 (76)
| 
| 6.5 (41)
| MCG
| 29,406
| 17 July 1954
|- bgcolor="#FFFFFF"
| 
| 6.9 (45)
| 
| 6.13 (49)
| Western Oval
| 30,250
| 24 July 1954
|- bgcolor="#FFFFFF"
| 
| 8.18 (66)
| 
| 13.8 (86)
| Lake Oval
| 23,000
| 24 July 1954
|- bgcolor="#FFFFFF"
| 
| 12.9 (81)
| 
| 6.13 (49)
| Brunswick Street Oval
| 20,000
| 24 July 1954

Round 14

|- bgcolor="#CCCCFF"
| Home team
| Home team score
| Away team
| Away team score
| Venue
| Crowd
| Date
|- bgcolor="#FFFFFF"
| 
| 12.13 (85)
| 
| 7.15 (57)
| Victoria Park
| 16,500
| 31 July 1954
|- bgcolor="#FFFFFF"
| 
| 9.11 (65)
| 
| 6.10 (46)
| Princes Park
| 25,863
| 31 July 1954
|- bgcolor="#FFFFFF"
| 
| 16.14 (110)
| 
| 5.3 (33)
| MCG
| 26,708
| 31 July 1954
|- bgcolor="#FFFFFF"
| 
| 6.5 (41)
| 
| 11.12 (78)
| Lake Oval
| 19,500
| 31 July 1954
|- bgcolor="#FFFFFF"
| 
| 8.19 (67)
| 
| 8.6 (54)
| Arden Street Oval
| 11,000
| 31 July 1954
|- bgcolor="#FFFFFF"
| 
| 16.14 (110)
| 
| 11.10 (76)
| Kardinia Park
| 28,158
| 31 July 1954

Round 15

|- bgcolor="#CCCCFF"
| Home team
| Home team score
| Away team
| Away team score
| Venue
| Crowd
| Date
|- bgcolor="#FFFFFF"
| 
| 12.15 (87)
| 
| 6.16 (52)
| Punt Road Oval
| 12,000
| 7 August 1954
|- bgcolor="#FFFFFF"
| 
| 9.5 (59)
| 
| 10.22 (82)
| Glenferrie Oval
| 7,000
| 7 August 1954
|- bgcolor="#FFFFFF"
| 
| 8.11 (59)
| 
| 6.12 (48)
| Brunswick Street Oval
| 10,000
| 7 August 1954
|- bgcolor="#FFFFFF"
| 
| 7.17 (59)
| 
| 18.13 (121)
| Junction Oval
| 12,000
| 7 August 1954
|- bgcolor="#FFFFFF"
| 
| 10.11 (71)
| 
| 6.16 (52)
| Windy Hill
| 23,000
| 7 August 1954
|- bgcolor="#FFFFFF"
| 
| 6.7 (43)
| 
| 8.12 (60)
| Western Oval
| 22,000
| 7 August 1954

Round 16

|- bgcolor="#CCCCFF"
| Home team
| Home team score
| Away team
| Away team score
| Venue
| Crowd
| Date
|- bgcolor="#FFFFFF"
| 
| 13.12 (90)
| 
| 7.6 (48)
| Kardinia Park
| 16,870
| 14 August 1954
|- bgcolor="#FFFFFF"
| 
| 12.16 (88)
| 
| 13.12 (90)
| Victoria Park
| 18,556
| 14 August 1954
|- bgcolor="#FFFFFF"
| 
| 10.16 (76)
| 
| 11.14 (80)
| Princes Park
| 29,744
| 14 August 1954
|- bgcolor="#FFFFFF"
| 
| 10.18 (78)
| 
| 15.4 (94)
| Punt Road Oval
| 24,000
| 14 August 1954
|- bgcolor="#FFFFFF"
| 
| 9.14 (68)
| 
| 9.14 (68)
| Arden Street Oval
| 22,000
| 14 August 1954
|- bgcolor="#FFFFFF"
| 
| 13.14 (92)
| 
| 9.15 (69)
| Junction Oval
| 11,500
| 14 August 1954

Round 17

|- bgcolor="#CCCCFF"
| Home team
| Home team score
| Away team
| Away team score
| Venue
| Crowd
| Date
|- bgcolor="#FFFFFF"
| 
| 14.13 (97)
| 
| 5.10 (40)
| MCG
| 16,700
| 21 August 1954
|- bgcolor="#FFFFFF"
| 
| 10.10 (70)
| 
| 6.11 (47)
| Glenferrie Oval
| 14,000
| 21 August 1954
|- bgcolor="#FFFFFF"
| 
| 7.17 (59)
| 
| 11.12 (78)
| Windy Hill
| 36,000
| 21 August 1954
|- bgcolor="#FFFFFF"
| 
| 6.14 (50)
| 
| 10.12 (72)
| Victoria Park
| 36,000
| 21 August 1954
|- bgcolor="#FFFFFF"
| 
| 22.11 (143)
| 
| 14.7 (91)
| Princes Park
| 12,100
| 21 August 1954
|- bgcolor="#FFFFFF"
| 
| 11.14 (80)
| 
| 14.11 (95)
| Lake Oval
| 15,000
| 21 August 1954

Round 18

|- bgcolor="#CCCCFF"
| Home team
| Home team score
| Away team
| Away team score
| Venue
| Crowd
| Date
|- bgcolor="#FFFFFF"
| 
| 19.15 (129)
| 
| 12.10 (82)
| Arden Street Oval
| 9,500
| 28 August 1954
|- bgcolor="#FFFFFF"
| 
| 17.15 (117)
| 
| 5.4 (34)
| Western Oval
| 22,896
| 28 August 1954
|- bgcolor="#FFFFFF"
| 
| 7.7 (49)
| 
| 14.17 (101)
| Lake Oval
| 25,000
| 28 August 1954
|- bgcolor="#FFFFFF"
| 
| 14.13 (97)
| 
| 13.13 (91)
| Brunswick Street Oval
| 20,000
| 28 August 1954
|- bgcolor="#FFFFFF"
| 
| 14.17 (101)
| 
| 6.12 (48)
| Punt Road Oval
| 25,000
| 28 August 1954
|- bgcolor="#FFFFFF"
| 
| 13.12 (90)
| 
| 6.13 (49)
| Kardinia Park
| 23,119
| 28 August 1954

Ladder

Finals series

Semi-finals

Preliminary final

Grand Final

This was 's maiden Grand Final appearance, while  were in their 9th Grand Final chasing their 7th VFL premiership. With most of the crowd behind them, Footscray got off to a big start, kicking six goals to one in the first quarter to eventually run out 51-point winners, doubling Melbourne's score. Melbourne would go on to win five of the next six Grand Finals.

Awards
 The 1954 VFL Premiership team was Footscray. This was the first premiership won by Footscray since it entered the VFL in 1925.
 The VFL's leading goalkicker was Jack Collins of Footscray who kicked 84 goals (including 11 goals in the final series).
 The winner of the 1954 Brownlow Medal was Roy Wright of Richmond with 29 votes (he had missed one match through illness, but still won the medal by 10 votes).
 St Kilda took the "wooden spoon" in 1954.

Notable events
 Despite winning the 'wooden spoon', St Kilda defeated both Grand Final teams during the home and away rounds.
 North Melbourne are renamed "The Kangaroos" from "The Shinboners".
 In round 8, Essendon champion full-forward John Coleman sustained a career-ending knee injury (he left the field having scored 42 goals in five and a half matches). With two other players also injured, Essendon finished the match with 17 men.
 A group of Fitzroy players and supporters, who were offered a series of side bets at 10/1, back Fitzroy. Fitzroy produces a shock result, beating Collingwood 12.9 (81) to 6.13 (49), and the punters collect around £2,000 (approx. $40,000 in 2007).
 An injured Charlie Sutton (he had not played in the second semi-final) is picked in Footscray's Grand-Final team. Although not playing in his usual back-pocket position, he plays reasonably well in the forward-pocket, and kicks three goals.

See also
 1954 VFL Grand Final

References

 Hogan, P., The Tigers of Old, The Richmond Football Club, (Richmond), 1996. 
 Maplestone, M., Flying Higher: History of the Essendon Football Club 1872–1996, Essendon Football Club, (Melbourne), 1996. 
 Rogers, S. & Brown, A., Every Game Ever Played: VFL/AFL Results 1897–1997 (Sixth Edition), Viking Books, (Ringwood), 1998. 
 Ross, J. (ed), 100 Years of Australian Football 1897–1996: The Complete Story of the AFL, All the Big Stories, All the Great Pictures, All the Champions, Every AFL Season Reported, Viking, (Ringwood), 1996.

External links
 1954 Season – AFL Tables

Australian Football League seasons
Vfl season